The Border Troops Academy or Tajik Frontier Institute, officially known as the Higher Border Institute of the State Committee for National Security, is a higher education college for training of officers for the Tajik Border Troops, located in Dushanbe, the capital of Tajikistan. It is a state institution.

History 

Academics 
Graduates are commissioned as lieutenants in the border troops.  As of 2016, it has trained more than 700 officers. Special courses are held here, overseen by the Organization for Security and Co-operation in Europe.

Heads 
 Abdurahmon Azimov (-August 2015)
 Shohiyoni Abdusattor (?)
Badriddin Mirzoev (?-10 July 2020)

References

Tajik Border Troops
Military academies of Tajikistan